Molls Cleuch Dod is a hill in the Moffat Hills range, part of the Southern Uplands of Scotland. A broad, grassy outlier of the surrounding hills, it is commonly ascended in rounds beginning from the Megget Stane and Talla Linnfoots or as a detour from the Grey Mare's Tail.

Subsidiary SMC Summits

References

Mountains and hills of the Southern Uplands
Mountains and hills of the Scottish Borders
Donald mountains